Ex'Act (stylized in all caps) is the third studio album by South Korean–Chinese boy band Exo. It was released by SM Entertainment in Korean and Chinese versions on June 9, 2016. The album was re-released under the title Lotto on August 18, 2016. Ex'Act is the third consecutive studio album by Exo to have sold over 1 million copies, and their fourth album to have won the Mnet Asian Music Award for Album of the Year.

Background and release
On May 31, 2016, Exo was announced to be releasing their third studio album. On June 2, it was revealed that the album's title was Ex'Act and Exo would be simultaneously promoting two singles, "Lucky One" and "Monster", with different visual concepts that correspond with the two versions of physical packagings for the album.

On June 7, 2016, it was revealed that notable music producers including Kenzie, The Stereotypes, and Dem Jointz participated in the production of the album, and member Chanyeol co-wrote the lyrics for the track "Heaven". Ex'Act and the music videos for its singles were released on June 9.

A re-packaged edition of the album, titled Lotto, was released on August 18, 2016. The edition adds four new songs including "Lotto", "Can't Bring Me Down", "She's Dreaming" which was written by member Chen, and a remix of "Monster" by LDN Noise.

Promotion
A promotional showcase for Ex'Act was held at Olympic Hall, Seoul on June 8, 2016. Exo began performing the album's singles on South Korean music television programs on June 9. They embarked on their third headlining concert tour The Exo'rdium in July 2016.

Exo began promoting the repackaged edition Lotto by performing the title track on South Korean music television programs on August 19. Member Kai was absent from promotional activities due to an injury he sustained during the concert tour.

KBS, MBC, and Mnet deemed "Lotto" "unfit for broadcast", thus Exo promoted the song with modified lyrics under an alternative title, "Louder", on these TV channels.

Singles
"Monster" and "Lucky One" peaked at number one and three respectively on the Billboard World Digital Songs chart, and at number one and five respectively on the Gaon weekly digital chart. "Monster" went on to win first place nine times in total on South Korean weekly music television shows.

"Lotto" debuted at number two on the Gaon weekly digital chart and at number one on the Billboard World Digital Songs chart. The song went on to win first place seven times in total on South Korean weekly music television shows.

Commercial performance

Ex'Act 
Prior to its release, Ex'Act received a record-breaking pre-order by retail outlets of over 660,000 physical copies. Three days after its release, the album became the fastest selling album in the history of South Korean album sales chart Hanteo at the time with over 450,000 physical copies sold, breaking the record previously held by Exo's fourth extended play Sing for You (2015).

The Korean and Chinese versions of the album debuted at number one and two respectively on the Gaon weekly album chart. Both versions combined, the album debuted and peaked at number 2 on the Billboard World Albums chart.

On October 22, 2017, the Korean Music Copyright Association revealed that "Monster" was the most streamed song of 2016 on two major South Korean music sites, Melon and Genie. It accumulated 190,898,389 and 36,688,492 million streams on each platform respectively, making Exo the most streamed group of 2016.

Lotto 
The Korean and Chinese versions of Lotto debuted at number one and two respectively on the Gaon weekly album chart. By the end of August 2016, Ex'Act had collectively sold 1,136,104 copies, becoming the third consecutive studio album by Exo to have sold over 1 million copies.

Accolades

Track listing
Credits adapted from Naver.

Charts

Korean and Chinese versions

Combined versions

Sales

Release history

References

2016 albums
Exo albums
Korean-language albums
Mandarin-language albums
SM Entertainment albums
Genie Music albums
Grand Prize Golden Disc Award-winning albums
Albums produced by LDN Noise